Herrickia glauca  is a North American species of flowering plants in the family Asteraceae, called the gray aster. It is native to the western United States, primarily in Arizona, New Mexico, Utah, Colorado, and Wyoming, with a few populations in Idaho and Montana.

Herrickia glauca is a perennial herb or subshrub up to 70 centimeters (28 inches) tall from a woody rhizome. The plant produces flower heads numerous heads (sometimes over 100) in a flat-topped array. Each head contains 8-19 lavender ray florets surrounding 12-32 yellow or purplish disc florets.

References

Astereae
Flora of the Western United States
Plants described in 1840
Flora without expected TNC conservation status